Dorna-Arini is a commune located in Suceava County, Bukovina, northeastern Romania. It is composed of six villages, more specifically: Cozănești (the commune center), Dorna-Arini, Gheorghițeni, Ortoaia, Rusca, and Sunători.

Administration and local politics

Communal council 

The commune's current local council has the following political composition, according to the results of the 2020 Romanian local elections:

Gallery

References 

Communes in Suceava County
Localities in Western Moldavia